The 1937 Navy Midshipmen football team represented the United States Naval Academy during the 1937 college football season. In their first season under head coach Hank Hardwick, the Midshipmen compiled a 4–4–1 record and outscored their opponents by a combined score of 150 to 74.

Schedule

References

Navy
Navy Midshipmen football seasons
Navy Midshipmen football